Elisa Blanchi (born 13 October 1987) is a former Italian rhythmic gymnast twice medal winner at Olympic Games.

Biography

She has competed in 3 Olympic Games, she and the Italian Group won the silver medal at the 2004 Summer Olympics in Athens. She was also part of the Italian bronze medal winning team at the 2012 Summer Olympics in the group all-around event together (with other group members Romina Laurito, Marta Pagnini, Elisa Santoni, Anzhelika Savrayuk and Andreea Stefanescu).  She was part of the 2009, 2010 and 2011 Italian Group that competed at the World Championships that won the Group All-around gold medal. Her teammates also won a pair of bronze medals at the 2012 World Cup Final in 5 Balls and 3 Ribbons + 2 Hoops.

Detailed Olympic results

References

External links
 
 

1987 births
Living people
People from Velletri
Italian rhythmic gymnasts
Olympic gymnasts of Italy
Olympic silver medalists for Italy
Olympic bronze medalists for Italy
Olympic medalists in gymnastics
Gymnasts at the 2004 Summer Olympics
Gymnasts at the 2008 Summer Olympics
Gymnasts at the 2012 Summer Olympics
Medalists at the 2012 Summer Olympics
Medalists at the 2004 Summer Olympics
Medalists at the Rhythmic Gymnastics World Championships
Medalists at the Rhythmic Gymnastics European Championships
Gymnasts of Centro Sportivo Aeronautica Militare
Sportspeople from the Metropolitan City of Rome Capital
21st-century Italian women